Sir Thomas Mostyn, 6th Baronet (20 October 1776 – 17 April 1831) of Mostyn Hall, Flintshire and Gloddaeth Hall, Caernarvonshire, was a Welsh Member of Parliament.

He was the only son of Sir Roger Mostyn, 5th Baronet and educated at Westminster School and Christ Church, Oxford. He succeeded his father to the baronetcy in 1796.

He was MP for Flintshire from 1796 to 1797 and again from 1799 to 1831. He was appointed High Sheriff of Caernarvonshire for 1798–99 and High Sheriff of Merionethshire for 1799–1800.

He died unmarried in 1831 and the baronetcy became extinct. His main estates passed to his sister Elizabeth and her husband, Sir Edward Pryce Lloyd, who was created Baron Mostyn later that year. The Baron's son adopted the additional name of Mostyn.

References

|-

|-

|-

1776 births
1831 deaths
People educated at Westminster School, London
Alumni of Christ Church, Oxford
Baronets in the Baronetage of England
High Sheriffs of Caernarvonshire
High Sheriffs of Merionethshire
Members of the Parliament of Great Britain for Welsh constituencies
British MPs 1796–1800
Members of the Parliament of the United Kingdom for Welsh constituencies
UK MPs 1801–1802
UK MPs 1802–1806
UK MPs 1806–1807
UK MPs 1807–1812
UK MPs 1812–1818
UK MPs 1818–1820
UK MPs 1820–1826
UK MPs 1826–1830